Mewtwo is a Pokémon, a fictional creature from Nintendo and Game Freak. Created by Ken Sugimori, it debuted in the video games Pokémon Red and Blue, and later appeared in subsequent sequels and spin-off titles, such as Pokken Tournament. In the video games, the player can fight and capture Mewtwo in order to subsequently pit it against other Pokémon. The player first learns of Mewtwo late in Pokémon Red and Blue by reading research documents left in a ruined laboratory on Cinnabar Island. Mewtwo is regarded as one of the series' strongest Pokémon, and was the strongest in the original games in terms of base statistic distribution. It is known as the "Genetic  Pokémon" and is a Legendary Pokémon, a special group of Pokémon that are very rare and usually very powerful.  Mewtwo has also appeared in various animated adaptations of the franchise.

Masachika Ichimura was the first to voice the original Mewtwo character in Japanese, and the creature's younger self is voiced by Fujiko Takimoto in the Sound Picture Box: Mewtwo's Origin CD drama and Showtaro Morikubo in the anime adaptation. In English, Jay Goede voiced Mewtwo in Pokémon: The First Movie (being credited under the pseudonym "Philip Bartlett") and the Pokémon Live! musical, while Dan Green provided the voice for The First Movies direct sequel, Pokémon: Mewtwo Returns. Green reprised the role in the 2019 remake of the first Pokémon movie, Pokémon: Mewtwo Strikes Back Evolution.

Actress Reiko Takashima voiced a second, unrelated Mewtwo in the Pokémon anime special Mewtwo: Prologue to Awakening and its direct sequel, Pokémon the Movie: Genesect and the Legend Awakened; this second Mewtwo is voiced by actress Miriam Pultro in the English dub. Mewtwo has featured in other game franchises, such as Super Smash Bros. series, in which Ichimura reprised in Super Smash Bros. Melee and Keiji Fujiwara in Super Smash Bros. for Nintendo 3DS and Wii U and Super Smash Bros. Ultimate. A third Mewtwo also appears in the 2019 live-action animated film Detective Pikachu, voiced simultaneously by Rina Hoshino and Kotaro Watanabe.

Design and characteristics
Japanese video game designer Ken Sugimori designed Mewtwo for the first generation of Pocket Monsters games, Red and Green, known outside Japan as Pokémon Red and Blue. In the games, Mewtwo is the result of genetic recombination of Mew's DNA that was born from Mew similar to real life clones. While most Pokémon are hatched from eggs, Mewtwo is the only Pokémon that was born. In the anime adaptation, however, it is instead a modified clone whose name means the "second Mew" that, instead of being born from a Mew like in the games, it was created in a tube with the DNA sample being from a Mew eyelash. Until the first Pokémon movie was released in the United States, Mewtwo was rarely referred to as a "clone" in Japanese sources. Kubo Masakazu, executive producer of Mewtwo Strikes Back, explained that they "intentionally avoid using the term 'kuron' [clone]… because the word has a frightening feel".

Despite being Mew's descendant, Mewtwo directly precedes Mew in the game's numerical Pokémon index, owing to the latter's secret inclusion by Game Freak programmer Shigeki Morimoto. During an interview, Pokémon Company president Tsunekazu Ishihara stated that Mewtwo was expected to be popular with North American audiences, citing their preference for strong, powerful characters.

In the original games, Mewtwo is intended to be "the strongest Pokémon ever". Due to genetic engineering being applied to a sample of Mew's DNA in order to fully create Mewtwo's genome, Mewtwo is an extremely powerful psychic, yet its abilities surpass Mew's due to intentional alterations to the genetic source material. As such, it can use telekinesis for flight, to shield itself, or to powerfully throw opponents aside. In addition, it is among the very few Pokémon capable of human speech, doing so via telepathy, alongside Zekrom, Reshiram, Zygarde, the Ultra Beast Naganadel, Xerneas, Diancie, Calyrex and Arceus. Otherwise, it conserves its energy until needed, such as against powerful opponents. In addition to its psychic abilities, Mewtwo can also regenerate, which allows it to quickly recover from near-fatal injuries. However, Mewtwo notably lacks Mew's ability to learn every single teachable move within the games.

Although Mewtwo's genome is almost identical to Mew's, the genetic engineering used to complete its creation nevertheless resulted in Mewtwo's appearance being very different in comparison to Mew's. Its appearance has been likened to "an over sized cross of cat, squirrel and kangaroo".

Although its modified genome resulted in its abilities surpassing Mew's, it also resulted in Mewtwo developing a vicious personality that is primarily interested in proving its own strength. The franchise's non-video game media, particularly the anime, has expanded upon the character. In the most notable instance, Mewtwo telepathically speaks with a male voice and is existentially torn over its purpose in the world.

For the sixth and seventh generations of the Pokemon video game series, Mewtwo has two Mega Evolved forms, Mega Mewtwo X and Mega Mewtwo Y. These can be activated if the player gives Mewtwo either the Mewtwonite X or the Mewtwonite Y.

Appearances

In video games

In Pokémon Red and Blue, the player learns of Mewtwo's existence by reading research notes left in the ruined Pokémon Mansion on Cinnabar Island. The notes say that the island's scientists discovered a new Pokémon in a Guyana jungle, that they named it Mew, and that it later gave birth to a creature they called Mewtwo; the game's Pokédex entry states that Mewtwo was "created by a scientist after years of horrific gene splicing and DNA engineering experiments". Mewtwo proved too mighty to control, destroying the laboratory and escaping. The player is later given an opportunity to capture Mewtwo in the Cerulean Cave, which is accessible only after defeating the game's final bosses, the Elite Four and Blue; in the remakes Pokémon FireRed and LeafGreen this prerequisite was expanded, requiring the player to explore more thoroughly and record information on sixty Pokémon species before access to the cave would be granted. Mewtwo can be caught in Pokémon HeartGold and SoulSilver in the same location as before after defeating all of the gym leaders in Kanto. The character was also the focus of a promotion and downloadable content giveaway for Pokémon Black and White. It was also said to be under a truck in one of the cities, though this was revealed to be a hoax. Mewtwo also reappears in Pokémon X and Y after completing the main story, and is one of the handful of Pokémon capable of using the new Mega Evolution mechanic, as it can transform into either Mega Mewtwo X or Mega Mewtwo Y.

Since its debut, Mewtwo has appeared in other Nintendo games, besides appearing in every Pokémon game. In Pokémon Stadium and Pokémon Pinball, Mewtwo appears as a final boss after all competitions have been completed. In Pokémon Puzzle League, Mewtwo serves not only as the final opponent, but also as the main antagonist responsible for the game's events. Other games, such as Super Smash Bros. Melee and the Pokémon Mystery Dungeon series, have featured Mewtwo as an unlockable player character that must be defeated before it may be used, while others like Pokémon Snap have featured the character in cameos, appearing once certain conditions have been met. For all appearances in which the character has spoken dialogue, Mewtwo is voiced by Masachika Ichimura, with the exception of Pokémon Puzzle League, where it is voiced by Philip Bartlett, and Super Smash Bros. for Nintendo 3DS and Wii U and Ultimate, where it is voiced by Keiji Fujiwara. After failing to make a playable appearance in Super Smash Bros. Brawl, Mewtwo returned to the series as a DLC character in Super Smash Bros. for Nintendo 3DS and Wii U on April 28, 2015, though it was made available to Club Nintendo members who registered both versions on April 15, 2015. In 3DS and Wii U, its Final Smash involves it Mega Evolving into Mega Mewtwo Y and using Psystrike, its signature move in the Pokémon games. Mewtwo also returned as a playable character in Super Smash Bros. Ultimate for the Nintendo Switch, where it is once again an unlockable character. A new form of Mewtwo, Shadow Mewtwo, appears as a boss character in Pokkén Tournament and has a special attack that involves it Mega Evolving into Mega Mewtwo X. In addition, its normal form appears as a playable character. In the augmented reality mobile game Pokémon Go, a different variation of Mewtwo's armored appearance from Pokémon: The First Movie was available for a limited time in Tier 5 Raids in July 2019. Mewtwo also appears as a usable Pokémon in Pokémon Masters as the partner of Giovanni, who first became playable in the first Legendary Event, “Lurking Shadow”. During the first part of the Villain Arc story with Team Rocket, “Looming Shadow of Kanto”, the player could obtain Giovanni Legendary Spirit to raise the rarity of Giovanni to 6-Star EX if the player also used all 20 Power-Ups for Giovanni, which gives it a power boost and makes his Sync Move target all opponents instead of one, and then in the second part of the arc, “Spreading Shadow”, the player could obtain Mewtwo Crystals to allow Giovanni’s Mewtwo to evolve into Mega Mewtwo Y, which makes it even stronger and replaces the move Confusion with Psystrike until the end of the battle.

In anime and related media
Mewtwo is featured in the film Pokémon: The First Movie as the main antagonist. Unlike in the games, it is shown to be the creation of the criminal organization Team Rocket, and is referred to as a clone instead of a genetically modified mammal. After Mewtwo destroys the laboratory where it was born, Team Rocket's leader, Giovanni, convinces Mewtwo he can help it control its powers, instead using Mewtwo as a weapon. After escaping Giovanni, Mewtwo questions the reason for its existence and declares revenge on its creators. To this end, it lures several Pokémon trainers, among them protagonist Ash Ketchum, to its island in order to clone their Pokémon. Once it does so, Mewtwo forces the originals to battle their clones in an effort to determine which set is superior, while Mewtwo faces its own genetic relative, Mew. Ash sacrifices himself to stop the fighting, though he is later revived from tears shed by both the originals and clones because of his sacrifice.

Mewtwo, upon acknowledging the selflessness of Ash's sacrifice, comes to the conclusion that one's actions determine who they are and not the circumstances of their birth. Soon after having this epiphany, Mewtwo and the clones are joined by Mew as they leave to find a sanctuary, with Mewtwo erasing all memory of the events from those gathered. In localizing the film for English-language audiences, Mewtwo's personality became more arrogant and megalomaniacal; localization director Norman Grossfield ruled the changes necessary, as he believed American audiences needed a "clearly evil" instead of ambiguous villain. In the film, Mewtwo is voiced by Jay Goede (credited as Philip Bartlett) in English, and by Ichimura in Japanese. In this film, Mewtwo displayed unique abilities and powers unseen in other Pokémon, such as blocking all Pokémon moves in his arena when the clones face off against the originals.

In September 1999, Nintendo published Sound Picture Box Mewtwo, which included The Birth of Mewtwo: Pokémon Radio Drama, a CD drama that expands upon Mewtwo's origins. Created by scientist Dr. Fuji, Mewtwo is one of several cloning attempts, which also include Amber, a clone of Fuji's deceased daughter. The young Mewtwo befriends Amber, communicating telepathically; however, the cloning process proves unstable, and she dies. To save the traumatized Mewtwo, Fuji erases its memories and puts it under sedation until its body finishes developing, leading to the events of the film. The CD drama was later adapted into a short anime, and was included with Japanese home releases and broadcasts of Mewtwo Strikes Back and later in North America in December 2001 as part of Mewtwo Returns. Mewtwo as a child is voiced in Japanese by Fujiko Takimoto for the CD drama and Showtaro Morikubo for the anime, while in the English localization the voice actor is uncredited.

In December 2000, the film was followed by a direct sequel, Pokémon: Mewtwo Returns, which was broadcast on Japanese television in December 2000 and released worldwide on home video and DVD in 2001. Voiced by Dan Green in English with Ichimura reprising the role in Japanese, Mewtwo and the clones have since found peace on Mount Quena in Johto, a region which directly neighbors Mewtwo's home region of Kanto. However, Giovanni, whose memories were left intact after the first film, locates and pursues Mewtwo. Assisted by Ash and his companions, Mewtwo comes to terms with its existence and defeats Giovanni, removing any memory of itself from his and his soldiers' minds, while leaving the others unaffected. As everyone departs, Mewtwo sets out on its own while the clones remain safely behind on Mount Quena.

Mewtwo also appears in the musical Pokémon Live!, a live action adaptation of the anime set after Pokémon: The First Movie, and is portrayed by Marton Fulop. In it, Mewtwo faces a robotic replica of itself, MechaMew2, created by Giovanni and able to learn any attacks used against it. However, after learning compassion from Mewtwo, the machine rebels and self-destructs. The 2006 television special Pokémon: The Mastermind of Mirage Pokémon features a hologram version of Mewtwo, created and controlled by the story's antagonist Dr. Yung. With help from a hologram Mew, Ash and his companions destroy the Mewtwo hologram and defeat Yung.

Another Mewtwo appears in the anime special Mewtwo: Prologue to Awakening and its direct sequel Pokémon the Movie: Genesect and the Legend Awakened, voiced by the actress Reiko Takashima. Compared to the original Mewtwo, this one is also conflicted about its existence, yet is more empathic to the point of not being belligerent toward humans, as shown when it protects Ash, Iris, Cilan, and Eric from the rampaging Genesect army. Unlike the original Mewtwo, this one is able to Mega Evolve into Mega Mewtwo Y; due to Mega Evolution not being fully introduced at the time, it is referred to in the film as Mewtwo's .

A Mewtwo, which was created by Mr. Fuji, appears in the anime miniseries Pokémon Origins, which is generally based on the plot of the video games Pokémon FireRed and LeafGreen. As such, Red goes to Cerulean Cave, and uses the Mega Evolution mechanic introduced in Pokémon X and Y to Mega Evolve his Charizard for the fight with Mewtwo, whom Red captures.

Mewtwo made its live-action animated debut in the 2019 movie Detective Pikachu. Mewtwo also appears in the film Pokémon: Mewtwo Strikes Back—Evolution, a remake of Pokémon: The First Movie, that premiered on July 12, 2019.

Mewtwo from the first film appears in Pokémon Journeys episode "Getting More Than You Battled For!". Mewtwo protects several Pokémon that had been abused by humans on Cero Island since its departure from Mount Quena. Ash recognizes Mewtwo while Goh meets it for the first time after they were saved from the waterfall. After defeating Ash and Goh in a battle, Mewtwo decides to leave Cero Island with the rescued Pokémon and teleports them back to the Cerise Laboratory, allowing them to retain their memories of the encounter.

In printed adaptations
Mewtwo has appeared as a central character in several books related to the Pokémon franchise, including novelizations of Mewtwo Strikes Back and Mewtwo Returns, both of which closely follow the events of the films. In December 1999, Viz Media published the children's picture book I'm Not Pikachu!: Pokémon Tales Movie Special, which featured children taking on traits of the characters from the film, including Mewtwo. In May 2001, Viz released a second children's book, Mewtwo's Watching You!, which featured a shy Mewtwo interestedly watching other Pokémon play.

In the manga series Pokémon Adventures, Team Rocket created Mewtwo, but some of its DNA is placed inside the Gym leader Blaine. Because of the DNA that they share, the two are unable to be separated for very long without becoming ill. Later, another Pokémon, Entei, is able to break the bond between the two by removing the DNA in Blaine's arm, at which point Mewtwo leaves. It eventually helps the main character of the series, Red, fight against Team Rocket leader Giovanni and his Deoxys.

In 1998, Toshihiro Ono was asked to write a story detailing Mewtwo's origin to coincide with the release of Pokémon: The First Movie. The 52-page comic, presented in the form of a flashback, was replaced midway by "The Birth of Mewtwo" animated short, resulting in little connection between Ono's work and the film. Regardless, it saw print as a side story for Pokémon: The Electric Tale of Pikachu in the July 1998 issue of CoroCoro Comic. In it, Mewtwo's creator Dr. Fuji takes on the role of a coach for the fully developed Pokémon, while his employers, Team Rocket, test its abilities. Learning of a plan to mass-produce it as a weapon, Fuji approaches Mewtwo and tells it to destroy the lab and Fuji himself. Mewtwo refuses, stating it cannot harm the doctor, who it regards as its father. Once captured by Team Rocket, Fuji tells Mewtwo that he is honored by the statement, and is then killed. Angered by his death, Mewtwo destroys the lab and escapes. In the present, Mewtwo cries in its sleep as it dreams of the events.

Reception
In the games, Mewtwo is consistently noted as being one of the strongest opponents, and has been described in Pokémon Red and Blue as being "the best Pokémon in the game", as well as "one of the rarest — and hardest to catch". Because of the character's multiple strengths and few weaknesses, it changes how players approach playing against each other, causing players to either develop strategies solely to defeat an opposing Mewtwo, or to prohibit its use when battling other players. IGNs staff bemoaned its exclusion from Super Smash Bros. Brawl. A poll by IGN on whether the character was missed by others in Brawl shared a similar sentiment, though they also described it as one of Super Smash Bros. Melees weakest characters. Professional Super Smash Bros. player Jason "Mew2King" Zimmerman takes his handle from Mewtwo, although he uses other characters in competition. Authors Tracey West and Katherine Noll called Mewtwo the fifth best Legendary Pokémon and the sixth best Pokémon overall. Jeremy Parish of Polygon ranked 73 fighters from Super Smash Bros. Ultimate "from garbage to glorious", listing Mewtwo as 40th and criticized. Kevin Slackie of Paste listed Mewtwo as one of the best Pokemon, and further stated Mewtwo has managed to stay relevant for over 20 years without the same exposure as Pikachu, which itself is a testament to its amazing staying power as one of the most powerful Pokémon. Gavin Jasper of Den of Geek ranked Mewtwo as 35th of Super Smash Bros. Ultimate characters, and calling Mewtwo as a Akuma of Pokémon. Mewtwo was ranked second in Complexs "The 50 Best Pokemon Up to Pokemon Crystal", with Elijah Watson saying "that Mewtwo actually exists somewhere on this planet, maybe it'll see its position on our list and spare us." IGN readers voted Mewtwo as the second-best pocket monster, receiving 86% of win percentage. Dale Bishir of IGN described Mewtwo as the most important Pokémon that impacted the franchise's history, and further stated that his prominence is seen all over the franchise, with him having two mega evolutions, his major role in the Detective Pikachu, being a playable character in Super Smash Bros., and even having two animated movies about him. Steven Bogos of The Escapist listed Mewtwo as fourth of their favorite Pokémon, describing it as undoubtedly the most powerful Pokémon of the original games.

The book Pikachu's Global Adventure: The Rise and Fall of Pokémon noted Mewtwo as popular with older male children who tend to be drawn to "tough or scary" characters; Mew in contrast was described as a polar opposite, a character popular with young girls who tend to be drawn to "cute" characters. Others books, such as Media and the Make-believe Worlds of Children, have noted a similar comparison, citing Mewtwo as "more aggressive-looking" compared to Mew and emphasizing the importance of the contrast for children. The book Gaming Cultures and Place in Asia-Pacific compares Sugimori's design of Mewtwo to that of Japanese tokusatsu films, namely monster films like the 1954 Godzilla in creating "monstrous yet familiar silhouettes from the past renewed agency in the form of eyes and expressions which cut through the viewer".

In reception to extended media for the Pokémon franchise, Mewtwo has been likened to Frankenstein's monster as a being born from artificial means and discontent with the fact. Theology Secretary for the Church of England Anne Richards described Mewtwo as representing a "parable about the pointlessness of force", and praised the character for displaying the Christian value of redemption. Other reactions have been mixed. While it has been cited as a "complex and compelling villain" by some critics, its goal of world domination was received as a trait shared by "…every anime villain…", and likened to a James Bond villain by Daily Record.

However, Animerica praised Mewtwo as a character with "philosophical depth" as well as for serving as "an adversary of almost infinite power and genuine malice" that the anime series had been lacking. Ken Hollings of Sight & Sound described Mewtwo as "brooding, articulate and vengeful where the other Pokémon remain bright blobs of wordless energy", and "Like a troubled elder brother, Mewtwo represents an older order of experience." Anime Classics Zettai!: 100 Must-See Japanese Animation Masterpieces praised the character as the best villain of the Pokémon film series, and one of Mewtwo Strikes Backs strongest elements. The Los Angeles Times cited its behavior as a point of humor in relation to its appearance as a "decidedly feline character."

Mewtwo's image is utilized for merchandise related to the Pokémon franchise, which includes toys, children's toothbrushes, and a playing piece for a Pokémon-themed version of Monopoly. Several action figures have been made, such as a posable figure by Hasbro in 2006 that included accessories to recreate its "Hyper Beam" and "Light Screen" attacks, and a six-inch-tall "talking" figurine by Jakks Pacific as part of a series to commemorate the anime's Battle Frontier story arc. Items marketed for adults featuring Mewtwo have also been sold and distributed by Nintendo, such as T-shirts. The island nation of Niue released a one-dollar coin featuring the character as part of a commemorative promotion for the Pokémon franchise, with Mewtwo on one side and the nation's coat of arms on the other. Mewtwo also appears on the port side of All Nippon Airways's Pocket Monsters Boeing 747 jumbo jet, alongside Mew.

References

External links

Mewtwo on Pokemon.com

Clone characters in video games
Fictional psychics
Genetically engineered characters in video games
Nintendo antagonists
Nintendo protagonists
Pokémon species
Super Smash Bros. fighters
Telepath characters in video games
Video game bosses
Video game characters introduced in 1996
Video game characters who can teleport